Małachowo-Wierzbiczany  is a village in the administrative district of Gmina Witkowo, within Gniezno County, Greater Poland Voivodeship, in west-central Poland.

History
Małachowo-Wierzbiczany, historically also known as Małachowo-Wierzbięcice, was a private village of Polish nobility, administratively located in the Gniezno County in the Kalisz Voivodeship in the Greater Poland Province of the Polish Crown.

During the German occupation of Poland (World War II), in 1940, the Germans expelled several Polish inhabitants to the General Government, and their farms were then handed over to German colonists as part of the Lebensraum policy.

Notable people
  (1903–1968), Polish historian and military officer, prisoner of war of the Oflag II-C during World War II

References

Villages in Gniezno County